Dermophis oaxacae,  also known Oaxacan caecilian, is a species of caecilian in the family Dermophiidae. It is endemic to southwestern Mexico and occurs on the Pacific slopes and the Balsas depression in the states of Jalisco, Michoacán, Guerrero, Oaxaca, and Chiapas.

Description
It has 119–139 primary and 101–133 secondary annuli; these high counts distinguish it from all other Dermophis. The body is somewhat robust and the head is relatively large. The mouth is subterminal. The eyes are visible through a layer of skin. Living animals have blue-black coloration. The annular grooves are ventrally marked with dark pigment, in sharp contrast to the otherwise pale venter.

Habitat and conservation
It is a subterranean species. It is probably viviparous.

Dermophis oaxacae is a  poorly known species with few recent observations. It is unknown to which degree deforestation is a threat to it.

References

oaxacae
Endemic amphibians of Mexico
Balsas dry forests
Taxa named by Robert Mertens
Amphibians described in 1930
Taxonomy articles created by Polbot